Karenia is the scientific name of two genera of organisms and may refer to:

Karenia (dinoflagellate), formerly included in Gymnodinium, some of which cause red tides.
Karenia (cicada), a genus of cicada